Owen Pilgrim (1 October 1893 – 13 January 1972) was a Barbadian cricketer. He played in four first-class matches for the Barbados cricket team from 1919 to 1926.

See also
 List of Barbadian representative cricketers

References

External links
 

1893 births
1972 deaths
Barbadian cricketers
Barbados cricketers
People from Saint John, Barbados